Inger Smits (born 17 September 1994) is a Dutch handball player for Borussia Dortmund and the Dutch national team.

She represented the Netherlands at the 2019 World Women's Handball Championship.

Her father  and brothers Kay and Jorn are also international handball players.

Achievements
EHF European League:
Winner: 2022
Bundesliga:
Winner: 2022

References

External links

1994 births
Living people
Dutch female handball players
People from Geleen
TTH Holstebro players
Expatriate handball players
Dutch expatriate sportspeople in Denmark
Dutch expatriate sportspeople in Germany
Handball players at the 2020 Summer Olympics
Sportspeople from Limburg (Netherlands)
VfL Oldenburg players
Olympic handball players of the Netherlands
21st-century Dutch women